Wilmon Newell (4 March 1878 – 25 October 1943) was an American entomologist.

He received his bachelor's (1897) and master's (1898) degrees from Iowa State University, along with an honorary doctorate in 1920.  In 1903, he was named State Entomologist of Georgia. In 1904, he served as Secretary of the Louisiana Crop Pest Commission, where he is credited for making important discoveries controlling the cotton boll weevil using powdered lead arsenate.

In 1910, Newell became state entomologist in Texas for five years. After the Florida legislature approved the Plant Act, Newell became the first Plant Commissioner for the Florida State Plant Board, where he directed a successful campaign to eradicate citrus canker. Newell also helped to establish the Florida Entomological Society.

His approach to control invasive insects and diseases has been criticized as a "scorched earth" approach, eliminating pests without regard to the environment or to economic losses to growers.

In 1921, Newell was selected to run the University of Florida’s College of Agriculture as well as its Experiment Station and Cooperative Extension Service. He also headed the USDA’s eradication campaign against the Mediterranean Fruit Fly in Florida in 1929. He held the title of Provost of Agriculture from 1938 until his death in October 1943.  His research areas included control methods or the cotton boll weevil, Argentine ant, and American foul brood in honeybees. During his career, he published technical papers on cotton and scale insects, apiculture, quarantine programs and procedures, and insect eradication.  Dr. Newell had a particular interest in ant taxonomy, but also conducted pioneering research on boll weevil control in Louisiana and maintained a deep interest in apiary work in Texas and other states. However, he was best known for his activities in control and eradication of plant pests. He directed eradication from Florida of the Mediterranean fruit fly, citrus canker, and citrus blackfly. He also surveyed extensively for the Argentine ant along the Gulf Coast, particularly in Louisiana.

He was a member of the advisory council of the Southern Forestry Service, member and president in 1920 of the American Association of Economic Entomologists. He was a charter member of the cotton states branch of the association, president of the Association of Southern Agricultural Workers in 1929, the University of Florida Representative to the Institute for Research in Tropical America, a member of the Soil Science Society, Administrator of the Florida State Soil Conservation, chairman of Florida Land-Use Planning Committee, chairman of the Advisory Committee on Agriculture, and the Florida Defense Council.

Newell was inducted into the Florida Citrus Hall of Fame in 1966.

External links

American entomologists
1878 births
1943 deaths
People from Hull, Iowa
Iowa State University alumni
Texas A&M University faculty
University of Florida faculty